Tire Trouble is a 1924 American short silent comedy film directed by Robert F. McGowan. It was the 21st Our Gang short subject released.

Plot
The gang are running their own taxi service, and come across Ernie and Farina delivering laundry to J. William McAllister, the wealthiest man in town. His doctor and his wife have both convinced him that he's sick, but when the kids visit him, they convince him otherwise. They all drive off in the taxi to Emerald Beach and have the time of their lives.

Cast

The Gang
 Joe Cobb — Joe
 Jackie Condon — Jackie
 Mickey Daniels — Mickey
 Allen Hoskins — Farina
 Ernest Morrison — Sunshine Sammy
 Mary Kornman — Mary

Additional cast
 Harry Rattenberry — J. William McAllister
 George B. French — doctor
 Lyle Tayo — Mme. La Rue
 Noah Young — police officer

References

External links

1924 films
American silent short films
American black-and-white films
1924 comedy films
1924 short films
Films directed by Robert F. McGowan
Hal Roach Studios short films
Our Gang films
Tires
1920s American films
Silent American comedy films